Fairies is the first studio album by the Japanese girl group Fairies. It was released in Japan on the label Sonic Groove on March 26, 2014.

Track listing 
 CD
 "Hikari no Hate ni"
 "White Angel"
 "More Kiss"
 "Song for You"
 "Beat Generation"
 "No More Distance"
 
 "Sparkle"
 "Tweet Dream"
 "Sweet Jewel"
 "Run with U"
 "Poker Face feat. MOMOKA"

 DVD/Blu-ray
The disks come with the limited CD+DVD and CD+Blu-ray editions
 More Kiss (video clip)
 Song for You (video clip)
 HERO (video clip)
 Sweet Jewel (video clip)
 Beat Generation (video clip)
 No More Distance (video clip)
 Tweet Dream (video clip)
 Sparkle (video clip)
 White Angel (video clip)
 Hikari no Hate ni (video clip)
 Run With U (video clip)

Charts

References

External links 
Discography on the Fairies' official site

Fairies (Japanese group)
2014 debut albums
Avex Group albums
Japanese-language albums